James William Davies (1934 – June 2020) was a Canadian cyclist. He competed in three events at the 1956 Summer Olympics.

References

External links
 

1934 births
2020 deaths
Canadian male cyclists
Olympic cyclists of Canada
Cyclists at the 1956 Summer Olympics
Place of birth missing